Chiara Spinelli later the princess of Belmonte (1744-1823) was an Italian noblewoman and pastellist.

Spinelli was born in Naples, the daughter of Troiano, the ninth Duke of Laurino, but who also published in philosophy. In 1762 she married Antonio Francesco Pignatelli, the prince of Belmonte, becoming his second wife. She was also the mistress of Ferdinand I of the Two Sicilies. She took part in the revolution which led to the creation of the Parthenopean Republic in 1799; at its collapse she was exiled to France. A self-portrait by Spinelli is held in the collection of the Uffizi in Florence; it was originally displayed alongside those of Irene Parenti Duclos and Anna Borghigiani.

References

1744 births
1823 deaths
Neapolitan princesses
Italian women painters
18th-century Italian painters
18th-century Italian women artists
Pastel artists
Painters from Naples